The lingual tonsils are a collection of lymphatic tissue located in the lamina propria of the root of the tongue. This lymphatic tissue consists of the lymphatic nodules rich in cells of the immune system (immunocytes). The immunocytes initiate the immune response when the lingual tonsils get in contact with invading microorganisms (pathogenic bacteria,  viruses or parasites).

Structure

Microanatomy
Lingual tonsils are covered externally by stratified squamous nonkeratinized epithelium that invaginates inward forming crypts. Beneath the epithelium is a layer of lymphoid nodules containing lymphocytes. Mucous glands located at the root of tongue are drained through several ducts into the crypt of lingual tonsils. Secretions of these mucous glands keep the crypt clean and free of any debris.

Blood supply
Lingual tonsils are located on posterior aspect of tongue which is supplied through:

 Lingual artery, branch of external carotid artery  
 Tonsillar branch of facial artery  
Ascending and descending palatine arteries
 Ascending pharyngeal branch of external carotid artery

Nerve supply
Lingual tonsils are innervated by tonsillar nerves from the tonsilar plexus, formed by the glossopharyngeal and vagus nerves.

Function

Like other lymphatic tissues, the function of lingual tonsils is to prevent infections. These tonsils contain B and T lymphocytes which get activated when harmful bacteria and viruses come in contact with tonsils. B lymphocytes kill pathogens by producing antibodies against them, while T lymphocytes directly kill them by engulfing them or indirectly by stimulating other cells of the immune system.

Clinical significance

Cancer
Squamous cell carcinoma is a type of neoplasm that can affect lingual tonsils.

Sleep apnea
Enlarged or hypertrophic lingual tonsils have the potential to cause or exacerbate sleep apnea.

Additional images

External links
 Pictures at usc.edu
  
 
  (labeled as 'lymphoid tissue')]
 Lingual Tonsil

References 

Lymphatics of the head and neck
Tongue
Tonsil